Antti Johannes Kaarne (27 November 1875, Messukylä - 14 July 1924, Turku; surname until 1906 Karlsson) was a Finnish industrial worker, smallholder, newspaper editor and politician. He was a member of the Parliament of Finland, representing from 1908 to 1911 the Christian Workers' Union of Finland (SKrTL) and from 1922 to 1923 the Socialist Workers' Party of Finland (SSTP). In 1923 he was imprisoned on sedition charges.

References

1875 births
1924 deaths
Politicians from Tampere
People from Häme Province (Grand Duchy of Finland)
Christian Workers' Union of Finland politicians
Socialist Workers Party of Finland politicians
Members of the Parliament of Finland (1908–09)
Members of the Parliament of Finland (1909–10)
Members of the Parliament of Finland (1910–11)
Members of the Parliament of Finland (1922–24)
Prisoners and detainees of Finland